Denis Nayland Smith is a character who was introduced in the series of novels Dr. Fu Manchu by the English author Sax Rohmer. He is a rival to the villain Dr. Fu Manchu.

History 

The character of Denis Nayland Smith was created in 1912 by Sax Rohmer, in the short story The Zayat Kiss, narrated by his friend Dr. Petrie. The short story was included in the fix-up novel The Mystery of Dr. Fu-Manchu. In the first three books, Smith serves in the Indian Imperial Police as a police commissioner in Burma who has been granted a roving commission, allowing him to exercise authority over any official group who can help him in his mission. When Rohmer revived the series in 1931, Smith, who has been knighted for his efforts to defeat Fu Manchu, is an ex-Assistant Commissioner of Scotland Yard. Nayland Smith had an affair with his rival's daughter, Fah Lo Suee.

In other media

Comics 

Nayland Smith was first brought to newspaper comic strips in a black and white daily comic strip Fu Manchu drawn by Leo O'Mealia (1884–1960) that ran from 1931 to 1933. The strips were adaptations of the first two Dr. Fu Manchu novels and part of the third. Nayland Smith made his first comic book appearance in Detective Comics #17 and continued, as one feature among many in the anthology series, until #28. These were reprints of the earlier Leo O'Mealia strips. In 1943, the serial Drums of Fu Manchu was adapted by Spanish comic artist José Grau Hernández in 1943. Nayland Smith appears in Avon's one-shot The Mask of Dr. Fu Manchu in 1951 by Wally Wood.

In the early 1970s, writer Steve Englehart and artist Jim Starlin approached DC Comics to adapt the television series Kung Fu into a comic book, as DC's parent company, Warner Communications, owned the rights to the series. DC Comics, however, was not interested in their pitch, believing the show's and the martial arts genre popularity would phase out quickly. The duo then approached Marvel Comics with the idea to create a kung fu-focused original comic. Editor-in-chief Roy Thomas agreed, but only if they would include the Sax Rohmer's pulp villain Dr. Fu Manchu, as Marvel had previously acquired the comic book rights to the character. Englehart and Starlin developed Shang-Chi, a master of kung fu and a previously unknown son of Dr. Fu Manchu. In Master of Kung Fu #17 (cover-dated April 1974), Steve Englehart and Jim Starlin adapted the character for the series. After Marvel's license with the Rohmer estate expired, Master of Kung Fu was cancelled in 1983, Smith and Petrie have not appeared in any Marvel properties since the end of the Master of Kung Fu series in 1983.

Films 
Fred Paul played Nayland Smith in The Mystery of Dr Fu-Manchu (1923) and The Further Mysteries of Dr Fu-Manchu (1924).
 O. P. Heggie played Nayland Smith in the films The Mysterious Dr. Fu Manchu (1929) and The Return of Dr. Fu Manchu (1930)
 Lewis Stone played Nayland Smith in film The Mask of Fu Manchu (1932)
 William Royle played Nayland Smith in film serial Drums of Fu Manchu (1940)
 Nigel Green played Nayland Smith The Face of Fu Manchu (1965)
 Douglas Wilmer played Nayland Smith The Brides of Fu Manchu (1966) and The Vengeance of Fu Manchu (1967)
 Richard Greene played Nayland Smith The Blood of Fu Manchu (1968) and The Castle of Fu Manchu (1969)
 Peter Sellers played Nayland Smith and Fu Manchu in The Fiendish Plot of Dr. Fu Manchu (1980)

Television 
 Cedric Hardwicke played Nayland Smith Fu Manchu: The Zayat Kiss (1952)
 Lester Matthews played Nayland Smith in The Adventures of Dr. Fu Manchu (1956) television series

Radio 
Hanley Stafford played Nayland Smith in The Shadow of Fu Manchu (1939–1940).

References

External links
 
 Denis Nayland Smith at Comic Vine
 Sir Denis Nayland Smith at Marvel.com

Male characters in literature
Male characters in film
Fictional British secret agents
Characters in British novels of the 20th century
Characters in British novels of the 21st century
Characters in pulp fiction
Film serial characters
Literary characters introduced in 1912
Fu Manchu